Madina Andreyevna Taymazova (born 30 June 1999) is a Russian judoka of Ossetian ethnicity. In 2021, she won one of the bronze medals in the women's 70 kg event at the 2020 Summer Olympics in Tokyo, Japan.

Career
In 2018, she won one of the bronze medals in the women's 70 kg event at the 2018 European U23 Judo Championships held in Győr, Hungary. She won a medal at the 2019 World Judo Championships.

In 2021, she won the silver medal in her event at the Judo World Masters held in Doha, Qatar.

References

External links
 
 
 

1999 births
Living people
Russian female judoka
Universiade medalists in judo
Universiade silver medalists for Russia
Medalists at the 2019 Summer Universiade
Judoka at the 2020 Summer Olympics
Medalists at the 2020 Summer Olympics
Olympic medalists in judo
Olympic bronze medalists for the Russian Olympic Committee athletes
Olympic judoka of Russia